The Ministry of Humanitarianism is a ministry responsible for disaster management and humanitarianism. The current Minister of Humanitarianism affairs is Maryam Qasim Ahmed.

See also
 Agriculture in Somalia

References

Government ministries of Somalia